The Lorrae Desmond Show was an early black and white, Australian television music and variety show, produced  by James Upshaw which aired from 1960 to 1964 on the ABC hosted by singer and entertainer Lorrae Desmond, later best known for her role as Shirley Gilroy in soap opera/serial A Country Practice, who won the Gold Logie for the program. The Lorrae Desmond Show was a similar to The Dinah Shore Show in the US, with emphasis on live performances and dance numbers. The final episode aired on 27 April 1964. Over 20 episodes of the series are held by the National Film and Sound Archive

Desmond at the time had been described as a talent in the vein of a young Cicely Courtneidge.

Cast 
Cast:
 The Channel 2 singers
 Jim Gussey and the ABC dance band
 John Lasen and the Squires
 Colin Croft
 Michael Cole
 Ted Hamilton

References

Australian variety television shows
1960 Australian television series debuts
1964 Australian television series endings
Australian Broadcasting Corporation original programming
Black-and-white Australian television shows
English-language television shows
Dance television shows